The Illinois State Fairgrounds is located in Springfield, Illinois. It hosts the annual Illinois State Fair in the summer as well as other events throughout the year. The fairgrounds encompasses 366 acres of land and was added as a historic district on the National Register of Historic Places in 1990. Notable venues include a 13,000-capacity grandstand and the Illinois State Fairgrounds Racetrack.

References

Historic districts on the National Register of Historic Places in Illinois
National Register of Historic Places in Springfield, Illinois
Tourist attractions in Springfield, Illinois
Fairgrounds in the United States
Event venues on the National Register of Historic Places in Illinois
Illinois State Fair